David Gill or Dave Gill may refer to:

Dave Gill (1887–1959), Canadian ice hockey coach
David Gill (astronomer) (1843–1914), Scottish astronomer
David Gill (civil servant), (born 1966), German civil servant
David Gill (football executive) (born 1957), British football executive
David Gill (film historian) (1928–1997)
David Macinnis Gill (born 1963), American author

See also
David McGill (disambiguation)
David MacGill (disambiguation)